Mohera Union is a union of Mirzapur Upazila, Tangail District, Bangladesh.

Demographics
According to the population census in 2011 performed by Bangladesh Bureau of Statistics, the total population of Mohera union was 27,144, in 5,816 households.

Education
The literacy rate of Mohera Union in 2011 was 56.8% (male 62.2%, female 51.5%).

See also
 Union council (Bangladesh)

References

Populated places in Dhaka Division
Populated places in Tangail District
Unions of Mirzapur Upazila